Joseph M. Bryan Boulevard (often signed as just Bryan Blvd) is a controlled-access corridor connecting Interstate 73 and Interstate 840 with Benjamin Parkway in Greensboro, North Carolina. The road formerly extended westward along Interstate 73 and Cornerstone Drive to connect with North Carolina Highway 68. It also used to serve as the main entrance for Piedmont Triad International Airport until I-73 was designated, and was once named "Airport Parkway". A construction project in 2006 relocated a segment of Bryan Boulevard to make room for the airport's new FedEx hub and third runway.

In May 2017, Bryan Boulevard was closed west of I-840 for construction of the Future I-73 Corridor. Bryan Blvd southwest of I-73 was re-signed as "Cornerstone Drive" and terminates at Regional Road. A portion of the road was also removed.

Bryan Boulevard is designated Secondary Road 2085.

Bryan Boulevard was named after Greensboro resident Joseph McKinley Bryan, an insurance executive and broadcasting pioneer. Bryan sat on executive boards of many different insurance companies like the Greensboro-based Jefferson-Pilot Corporation (now Lincoln National Corporation). In 1934, he became president of WBIG, which was Greensboro's only radio station at the time. Later on, Bryan's company founded WBTV, the first television station in the Carolinas.

This is one of five freeways/expressways in Greensboro to use the "Boulevard" designation; the Greensboro Urban Loop is sometimes known as Painter Boulevard, O'Henry Boulevard carries a stretch of US 29 east of downtown, I-40 (formerly Business I-40) is routed along Fordham Boulevard, Business I-85 is also signed as Preddy Boulevard, and one section of West Gate City Boulevard has an expressway grade. Bryan Boulevard is the only one to be called by name rather than by number by locals.

Exit list
The entire road is in Guilford County. No mile makers are posted and all exits are unnumbered.

See also
Greensboro Urban Loop
Interstate 73
North Carolina Highway System

References

Freeways in North Carolina
Transportation in Greensboro, North Carolina
Interstate 73
Transportation in Guilford County, North Carolina